The Laodicean Church was a Christian community established in the ancient city of Laodicea (on the river Lycus, in the Roman province of Asia, and one of the early centers of Christianity). The church was established in the Apostolic Age, the earliest period of Christianity, and is probably best known for being one of the Seven churches of Asia addressed by name in the Book of Revelation (Rev. 3.14–22).

References in Colossians
The Christian community in Laodicea seems to have been closely connected with that of nearby Colossae (also in the Lycus valley,  distant). Laodicea is mentioned four times in the New Testament's epistle to the Colossians (Col. 2:1; 4:13,15,16). In writing to the Colossians, Paul the Apostle sends greetings to them through a Laodicean named Nymphas and the church at their house (Col 4:15). He additionally greets Archippus, who might also be from Laodicea (4:17), and he instructs the Colossians to exchange his letter with one he has written to the Laodiceans (4:16). If the Colossian epistle is genuinely by Paul, then this would indicate a Christian presence in Laodicea as early as the 50s CE. It would also indicate that Laodicea (like Colossae) was not evangelized by Paul, but possibly by his disciple Epaphras
().

In Colossians 4:16, Paul states: "And when this epistle hath been read among you, cause that it be read also in the church of the Laodiceans; and that ye also read the epistle from Laodicea." This reference to a letter which the Colossians were to obtain "from Laodicea" has created a puzzle which has not yet received a generally accepted solution.

Various alternatives have been suggested:

the epistle in question has been lost
the wording of Col 4:16 indicates that the letter was not written to but from Laodicea
Tertullian suggested that Marcionite heretics changed the title of the canonical epistle to the Ephesians
an apocryphal Epistle to the Laodiceans has had some supporters at times, but modern scholars now regard it as a forgery
it is actually one of the other canonical epistles, such at the Letter to Philemon or the Epistle to the Hebrews

No general agreement currently exists as to whether the letter is extant under another name or was lost prior to the formation of the canon.

The Laodicean Church in the Revelation of John (Revelation 3:14–22)
In John's vision, recorded in the book of Book of Revelation, Christ instructs John to write a message to the seven churches of Asia Minor. The message to Laodicea is one of judgment with a call to repentance.  The oracle contains a number of metaphors.

"I wish that you were cold or hot" (Revelation 3:15–16)

The traditional view has been that the Laodiceans were being criticized for their neutrality or lack of zeal (hence "lukewarm").  One problem with this is that Christ's desire that they be either “cold or hot” implies that both extremes are positive.  The traditional view saw “cold” as a negative, the idea apparently being that Jesus either wants the readers to be either zealous (“hot”) for him or completely uncommitted (“cold”), but not middle-of-the-road. A middle-of-the-road stance was thought to pollute the pure representation of the faith and create misconceptions about the church and its ideals.

However, a more recent interpretation has suggested that this metaphor has been drawn from the water supply of the city, which was lukewarm, in contrast to the hot springs at nearby Hierapolis and the cold, pure waters of Colossae.  The archaeology shows that Laodicea had an aqueduct that probably carried water from hot mineral springs some five miles south, which would have become tepid before entering the city (see main Laodicea article).   The imagery of the Laodicean aqueduct suggests not that "hot" is good and "cold" is bad, but that both hot and cold water are useful, whereas lukewarm water is emetic.

"Poor, blind, and naked" (3:17–18)

The words attributed to the Laodiceans may mark an ironic over-confidence in regard to spiritual wealth; they are unable to recognize their bankruptcy. However, the image may also be drawing on the perceived worldly wealth of the city. The city was a place of great finance and banking. In 60 A.D. the city was hit by a major earthquake. The city refused help from the Roman Empire and rebuilt the city itself.

The reference to the "white raiment" may refer to the cloth trade of Laodicea. The city was known for its black wool that was produced in the area. The reference to eye medication is again often thought to reflect the historical situation of Laodicea. According to Strabo (12.8.20) there was a medical school in the city, where a famous ophthalmologist practiced. The city also lies within the boundaries of ancient Phrygia, from where an ingredient of eye-lotions, the so-called "Phrygian powder", was supposed to have originated.

"Behold, I stand" (3:20)

This is among the most famous images of the Revelation, and is the subject of the famous painting The Light of the World by Holman Hunt. It bears similarities to a saying of Jesus in Mark 13:33–37, and Luke 12:35–38. The door in the painting has no handle, and can therefore be opened only from the inside.

Commentators variously view it as a metaphor of intimate fellowship, and/or a reference to the eschatological parousia of Christ. The theme of divine invitations to eat are found both in the New Testament (e.g., the Parable of the Wedding Feast) and in Graeco-Roman religion. Commentators have also suggested that Revelation 3:20 is the only New Testament reference to the Song of Solomon in the Old Testament, linking this verse with Song of Solomon 5:2. Various papyri, such as "POxy 3693", include invitations to attend a dinner with gods such as Sarapis, but these are issued by specified individuals to feasts at a temple of a god and do not suggest the visitation of the home by the divinity.

Later Christian Laodicea

There was a Council in Laodicea, A.D. c. 363–64, although the date is disputed. The Council of Chalcedon in 451 approved the canon of this council, making these canon ecumenical. The city remains a titular see of the Roman Catholic Church, Laodicensis in Phrygia.

See also
Christianity in Turkey

References

Citations

Further reading

Aune, David, Revelation, Word Biblical Commentary, Dallas Texas, 1997.
Barclay, William, Letters to the Seven Churches, Edinburgh, 1957 (reprinted 2001).

Apostolic sees
Book of Revelation